Edinburgh Square may refer to:
 Edinburgh Square in Caledonia, Ontario, Canada
 Edinburgh Place in Hong Kong